Mark Jones may refer to:

Arts and entertainment 
Mark Jones (1889-1965), American actor in Haunted Spooks, Number, Please? (1920 film) and Now or Never (1921 film)
Mark Bence-Jones (1930–2010), British writer
Mark Jones (actor) (1939–2010), British actor
Mark Jones (museum director) (born 1951), British art historian and museum director
Mark Jones (musician) (born 1952), American visual artist, musician and poet
Mark Jones (filmmaker) (born 1959), American screenwriter, director and producer
Mark Lewis Jones (born 1964), Welsh actor
Mark Jones (born 1967), real name of English comedian Mark Lamarr
Mark Jones (Wall of Sound) (fl. 1990s), English musician, founder of Wall of Sound Records
Mark Jones, English musician, co-founder of Jeepster Records in 1995
Mark W Jones, author of A Walk around the Snickelways of York

Sports

Association football (soccer)
Mark Jones (footballer, born 1933) (1933–1958), English defender who played for Manchester United until his death in the Munich air disaster
Mark Jones (footballer, born September 1961), English midfielder who played for Oxford United, Swindon Town and Cardiff City
Mark Jones (footballer, born October 1961), English full back who played for Aston Villa, Brighton & Hove Albion, Birmingham City and Hereford United
Mark Jones (footballer, born 1966), Australian defender who played in the National Soccer League
Mark Jones (footballer, born 1968), English midfielder who played for Walsall, Exeter City and Hereford United
Mark Jones (footballer, born 1979), English striker who played for Wolves, Cheltenham, Chesterfield and Raith Rovers
Mark Jones (footballer, born 1984), Welsh international footballer

Other sports
Mark Jones (sportscaster), Canadian sportscaster for ESPN and ABC
Mark Jones (basketball, born 1961), American NBA basketball player for the New Jersey Nets
Mark Jones (rugby, born 1965), Wales international rugby union, and rugby league footballer
Mark Jones (darts player) (born 1970), English professional darts player
Mark Jones (basketball, born 1975), American NBA basketball player for the Orlando Magic
Mark Jones (motocross rider) (born 1979), British professional motocross rider
Mark Jones (rugby union, born 1979), Wales international rugby union winger
Mark Jones (American football) (born 1980), American football wide receiver
Mark Jones (racing driver) (born 1980), British auto racing driver

Others
Mark Wilson Jones (born 1956), architect and architectural historian

See also
Marc Jones (disambiguation)
Marcus Jones (disambiguation)